Artour Samsonov (born 9 September 1980) is a Russian-born American rower. He competed at the 2004 Summer Olympics in Athens, where he placed 11th in the men's coxless pair, along with Luke Walton.  He graduated from Harvard University.

References

1980 births
Living people
Russian emigrants to the United States
American male rowers
Olympic rowers of the United States
Rowers at the 2004 Summer Olympics
Harvard Crimson rowers